Diethyl tartrate is an organic compound with the formula (HOCHCO2Et)2 (Et = ethyl).  Three stereoisomers exist, R,R-, S,S-, and R,S (=S,R-). They are the ethyl esters of the respective R,R-, S,S-, and R,S-tartaric acids. The R,R- and S,S- isomers are enantiomeric, being mirror images. The meso stereoisomer is not chiral.  The chiral isomer is far more common.

In the Sharpless epoxidation, diethyl tartrate and titanium isopropoxide form a chiral catalyst in situ.  The TADDOL ligand scaffold is produced from diethyl tartrate.

References

Ethyl esters
Tartrate esters